Neighbours is an Australian television soap opera. It was first broadcast on 18 March 1985 and currently airs on digital channel Eleven. The following is a list of characters that appeared in the show in 2017, by order of first appearance. All characters are introduced by the shows executive producer Jason Herbison. The 33rd season of Neighbours began airing from 9 January 2017. Andrea and Willow Somers made their debuts during the same month. Teacher Finn Kelly was introduced during March, while Dipi, Kirsha and Yashvi Rebecchi, along with Dipi's sister Mishti Sharma, arrived in April. Jeremy Newell and Mannix Foster appeared in June. Evan Lewis and Fay Brennan were introduced during the following month. September saw the first appearance of Hamish Roche, while Cassius Grady (uncredited until May 2018) and Rory Zemiro made their debuts in November. Joanne Schwartz appeared in December.

Andrea Somers

Andrea Somers, played by Madeleine West, made her first appearance on 20 January 2017. West previously played Dee Bliss, who was presumed dead in 2003 when her husband Toadfish Rebecchi (Ryan Moloney) accidentally crashed their car into the sea. On 15 September 2016, Tiffany Dunk of News.com.au reported that West had reprised the role of Dee. West returned to filming that same week. However, during the episode broadcast on 2 February 2017, it was revealed that Dee was actually an impostor named Andrea Somers. Andrea is impersonating Dee to gain money from the Bliss family estate. She also includes her daughter Willow Somers (Mieke Billing-Smith) in the scam, by pretending that she is Toadie's daughter. Five months after Andrea's exit, West made a surprise return to the show on 14 August 2017. Her appearance was not announced beforehand and the closing credits stated it was a "Special appearance by Madeleine West", leading viewers to speculate that it was the real Dee and not Andrea. West later appeared during the season finale on 8 December 2017. Her character was seen watching Toadie's vow renewal from a taxi. Her character name was again withheld. She was seen again during the return episode on 8 January 2018. It was later confirmed on-screen that Andrea had been in Erinsborough to check up on Toadie, and Daniel Kilkelly of Digital Spy believed Andrea was the woman in the taxi. A set of flashbacks broadcast on 27 June 2018 showed Andrea had fallen pregnant after having sex with Toadie. She later fled town leaving her son Hugo Somers (John Turner) with Sindi Watts (Marisa Warrington). As Andrea and the real Dee Bliss came face-to-face in July 2019, West revealed that they are twins, who were separated at birth.

Jasmine Udagawa

Jasmine Udagawa, played by Kaori Maeda-Judge, made her first appearance on 26 January 2017. Maeda-Judge joined the show's cast on a recurring basis, and on-screen Jasmine challenges business rival Paul Robinson (Stefan Dennis). Jasmine soon becomes involved in the mystery story surrounding the paternity of David Tanaka (Takaya Honda) and Leo Tanaka (Tim Kano). Jasmine shifts her attention from Paul to Leo, who she believes is related to her. Not wanting him to inherit Lassiter's she concocts a plan to sabotage his backpackers business and force him to leave Erinsborough. Terese Willis (Rebekah Elmaloglou) soon becomes suspicious of Jasmine's vendetta against Leo and snoops in a secret file and is shocked to learn he could potentially gain control of Lassiter's. Discussing Jasmine's ruthless plan to run Leo out of Erinsborohough, Daniel Kilkelly from Digital Spy said that "talk about a u-turn! [...] she certainly doesn't mess about." He added that the "very intriguing" story would progress with Amy Williams (Zoe Cramond) discovering the truth about Jasmine's file on Leo. It soon became clear that Jasmine's theories were incorrect.

Terese sees Jasmine working with her investor James Udagawa (Samuel David Humphrey) and mistakes her for his new assistant. Jasmine introduces herself as James's sister, before leaving to look around the Lassiter's complex. James explains that Jasmine has convinced their dying grandfather that she needs to step in and he warns Terese to watch her, as he is being relocated. Jasmine returns and has some questions for Terese after going through the books. A couple of weeks later, Jasmine brings her grandfather. Toshiro Udagawa (Lawrence Mah), to see an exhibition at Lassiter's Hotel and reacts to the mention of Leo name. Terese raises the moment with Jasmine, who decides to look into it. She asks Terese to continue to bring down Paul's business, but later changes her mind and tells Terese to drive Leo and his business out of Erinsborough.

Terese becomes suspicious of Jasmine's intentions and reads her secret file on him. Jasmine warns Terese that Leo could inherit the hotel. Amy overhears their exchange and decides to investigate. Jasmine tries to bribe Leo with money which leads him to suspect that they are related. When Jasmine confronts Toshiro, he contacts Kim Tanaka (Jenny Young) who is forced to reveal that her sons are not related to the Udagawas and that they are actually Paul's biological children. Later, Jasmine begins suspecting that something is wrong with Terese and eventually discovers that she has been diagnosed with breast cancer. Jasmine informs Terese that the Udagawa board has decided to pull their investment out of Lassiter's.

Willow Somers

Willow Somers, played by Mieke Billing-Smith, made her first appearance on 31 January 2017. Billing-Smith's casting and her character details were announced on 23 January. Willow was introduced as the teenage daughter of Andrea Somers (Madeleine West), posing as Dee Bliss, who tells Toadfish Rebecchi (Ryan Moloney) that Willow is his daughter. Daniel Kilkelly of Digital Spy praised Billing-Smith for her role in the Andrea/Toadie storyline, saying she had been "a great discovery for the show". He also hoped Willow would return, especially as the show had a history of character's taking in "random waifs and strays". Executive producer Jason Herbison stated that he loved the character, and explained, "It's always a great dynamic when you have a child who's forced to parent an adult. She really was a leaf blown about in the breeze created by Andrea. I thought Mieke did a terrific job." He added that there was a chance Willow could return in the future. It was later confirmed that the character would be returning on 11 July. Willow departed again on 4 August, after deciding to live with her father Fergus Olsen (Andrew Percy), before making a guest appearance from 8 December for Toadie and Sonya Rebecchi's (Eve Morey) vow renewal. Billing-Smith reprised her role for another guest stint as Willow from 10 June 2019.

Willow's mother Andrea brings her to Erinsborough when she decides to scam Toadfish Rebecchi by posing as his deceased wife Dee Bliss. When Toadie finds Willow in Andrea's motel room, Andrea tells him Willow is his daughter. Willow is forced to go along with her mother's plan and she spends time with Toadie. They bond over her desire to become a pilot and he helps her get into a private school. Willow becomes involved in a fake ID scheme with Piper Willis (Mavournee Hazel), and tries to blackmail Elly Conway (Jodi Anasta) with a photoshopped picture of Elly in bed with student Angus Beaumont-Hannay (Jai Waetford). After Willow and Andrea flee to London, Toadie is able to use Willow's social media to track them down. After Toadie discovers Andrea's real identity, Willow tries to talk to him, but he walks into the road and is struck by a taxi. Willow visits him in the hospital. She also tries, unsuccessfully, to convince her mother to give back the $100,000.

Months later, Willow returns to Erinsborough and tidies up Sonya Rebecchi's garden nursery following a storm. Sonya later catches Willow outside her home and Willow sprains her wrist when she falls. Sonya takes her to the hospital, where Toadie meets them. Willow explains that she ran away from Andrea, after they failed to find her real father and Andrea lied about repaying Toadie. As Willow cannot support herself, Toadie decides that she can stay with him instead of going into care. Sonya gives Willow a job at the nursery. Toadie later decides that he and Willow should move into one of the Eclipse apartments at Lassiter's, as Number 32 is too crowded. Willow learns that her father, Fergus Olsen (Andrew Percy), is living in Port Macquarie and she decides she wants to meet him. Fergus comes to Erinsborough to meet Willow. He tells her how a swimming accident that left him paralysed helped him change his life around. He is married and has two young daughters. After spending some time with him, Fergus invites Willow to stay with him and his family. Willow weighs up the pros and cons of going to Port Macquarie, and eventually decides to go. Toadie decides to go with her to see her settle in. She tells Ben during her farewell party that she always thought something romantic would happen between them, and he agrees, but he was taking his time. Willow visits Sonya and Nell to say goodbye. She tells Sonya that if she wants Toadie back, not to take too long as Amy Williams (Zoe Cramond) has feelings for him. Willow returns to Erinsborough on Christmas Day to act as a bridesmaid at Sonya's surprise vow renewal for Toadie.

Toadie contacts Willow to let her know that he has Andrea's phone number, and she advises him to throw it away. Willow then tells Sindi Watts (Marisa Warrington) that she does not want to see Andrea, although she has been in contact. She also explains that there is something that Toadie and Sonya do not know about Andrea. Months later, Toadie informs Willow that a private detective has found Andrea in Perth. Willow flies to Erinsborough and asks that he and Sonya do not contact her. They explain that they need to try, as they want to get their money back. Willow's secret is revealed when Sindi abruptly arrives with Andrea and Toadie's baby son, Hugo Somers (John Turner). She explains that a heavily pregnant Andrea returned to Erinsborough on the day of the vow renewal, and Willow persuaded her to stay away from the Rebecchis. Toadie and Sonya assume custody of Hugo in Andrea's absence, and eventually track her down to a psychiatric facility in Tasmania. Willow accompanies them to visit her mother, who believes she is Dee Bliss and does not remember either of her children. Months later, Willow returns to Erinsborough and finds that her grandmother, Heather Schilling (Kerry Armstrong), is posing as "Alice Wells", the Rebecchis' nanny. Willow tricks Heather into revealing she has poisoned Sonya and left her to die. She warns Toadie and they rescue Sonya in time. Willow is devastated by how her family has hurt the Rebecchis again, but Toadie insists she is part of their family and should not feel guilty for her mother and grandmother's actions. The following year, Sonya dies of ovarian cancer and Willow returns for her memorial.

Months later, Willow returns to Erinsborough when she hears Andrea has made contact with Toadie, wanting to reconnect with Hugo. She decides to stay for a while to make sure Andrea is not trying to con Toadie again. However, it later emerges that Dee Bliss is alive and Andrea and Heather try to track her down. However, Andrea pushes Dee off a cliff, assumes her identity again, and returns to Ramsay Street to con Toadie. However, Heather and Dee later arrive in Ramsay Street and Willow rushes inside Number 30 where she is unable to tell the difference between Andrea, who pretends not to know her and Dee. When Dee prevails, Andrea attempts to flee, but Willow tackles her to the floor, and she is arrested and hospitalised for broken ribs. Willow then visits Andrea in hospital and returns to Port Macquarie after disowning her. She later speaks to Dee through Skype after it is revealed she is Andrea's twin sister. When Dee returns to visit Andrea and Heather in prison the following year, she reveals that Willow has passed her final school examination and has commenced pilot training.

Finn Kelly

Finn Kelly, played by Rob Mills, made his first screen appearance on 15 March 2017. The casting and character details were officially announced on 15 November 2016. Luke Dennehy of the Herald Sun reported that Mills had begun filming his first scenes during the same week. Finn is "a progressive and respected school teacher", who joins the staff of Erinsborough High after being hired by Susan Kennedy (Jackie Woodburne). Finn was also introduced as Elly Conway's (Jodi Anasta) former boyfriend. Executive producer Jason Herbison called Finn "a really intriguing character" with some unexpected secrets. Following his guest stint, Johnathon Hughes of Radio Times branded Finn "one of the nastiest characters Neighbours has ever seen." Mills reprised the role in 2018, and he was promoted the regular cast in 2019.

Mishti Sharma

Mishti Sharma, played by Scarlet Vas, made her first appearance on 18 April 2017. The character and casting details were announced on 27 March. Mishti is Dipi Rebecchi's (Sharon Johal) sister. She arrives in Erinsborough with Dipi's husband Shane Rebecchi (Nicholas Coghlan). Coghlan explained that Mishti helps her brother-in-law when he considers moving to the area. The actor also described Mishti as "a dear friend" to Shane and said the two characters "share some pretty serious confidences." Mishti comes to Erinsborough wanting a fresh start. However, Daniel Kilkelly of Digital Spy thought she had a dark secret, noting "there's also an air of sadness about her."

Dipi Rebecchi

Dipi Rebecchi, played by Sharon Johal, made her first appearance on 24 April 2017. The character and casting details were announced on 27 March. Johal originally auditioned for the role of Dipi's sister Mishti Sharma, but the character's age was lowered and Scarlet Vas was cast. The producers liked Johal, so they decided to make Dipi work for her. Dipi is the wife of Shane Rebecchi (Nicholas Coghlan), the older brother of established regular Toadfish Rebecchi (Ryan Moloney), who returns to Erinsborough with his new family after 22 years. Dipi and Shane move to Erinsborough with their two daughters Yashvi (Olivia Junkeer) and Kirsha Rebecchi (Vani Dhir). The character was billed as "a ray of sunshine to those around her. Enthusiastic, bubbly and having an infectious lust for life, she always sees the best in people." Dipi takes over the lease of Harold Café.

Kirsha Rebecchi

Kirsha Rebecchi, played by Vani Dhir, made her first appearance on 24 April 2017. The character and casting details were announced on 27 March. Dhir received the audition for the role through her stage school Young Australian Broadway Chorus. Of her casting, Dhir commented "I was happy and thrilled to get this role as I am now doing what I love and enjoying every bit of it. I wish I could be filming everyday but I have to go to school." When she is on set, Dhir films her scenes in a couple of hours, so she can keep up with her schooling. Kirsha is Shane (Nicholas Coghlan) and Dipi Rebecchi's (Sharon Johal) younger daughter. She is intelligent and enjoys reading. Kirsha is also shy and finds the move to Erinsborough terrifying, as she questions whether she will be accepted. Dhir told Preeti Jabbal of Indian Link that she is the opposite of the "anxious and nerdy" Kirsha. Dhir departed the serial on 22 November 2019, as Kirsha moves to Sydney for a scholarship. She later returned for guest stints on 30 December 2019, 29 June 2020, and 4 December 2020.

Kirsha arrives in Erinsborough with her mother Dipi and older sister Yashvi Rebecchi (Olivia Junkeer). Her father, Shane, reveals that he has rented Number 32 Ramsay Street for the family, and has bought Harold's Café for Dipi. Dipi bakes Anzac Biscuits and asks Kirsha and Yashvi to give them out to the community. Kirsha struggles with the move, but befriends Jimmy Williams (Darcy Tadich). Shane later buys back Kirsha's dog Clancy to cheer her up. Dipi, Kirsha and her aunt Mishti Sharma (Scarlet Vas) show Aaron Brennan (Matt Wilson) Shane's solar-powered lawnmower in the hope he can help them sell it to an investor. They take it out to show Aaron what it can do, but Kirsha accidentally drives it into the lake. Kirsha is paired with Tia Martinez (Erica Brown) for a school assignment, and Tia later invites her to a sleepover, which Kirsha does not want to attend. Dipi encourages her to go and Kirsha eventually agrees. However, she goes missing after Dipi drops her off at Tia's house. She is found the following morning sleeping in the garden bar. Kirsha tells her parents that she does not feel like she belongs in Erinsborough. Tia later forces Kirsha to steal Elly Conway's (Jodi Anasta) clothes, while she is showering at the school. Ben Kirk (Felix Mallard) teaches Kirsha how to play the guitar, and she joins him in a couple of public performances. Kirsha accidentally drops a lit sparkler into a box of Yashvi's fireworks, which go off and result in Kirsha suffering minor burns to her face and hearing loss, caused by nerve damage. She is given a course of steroids to help her recovery, which makes her anxiety worse. Yashvi apologises to Kirsha, but Kirsha says that it was an accident and no ones fault.

Kirsha fails a hearing test, and learns that her hearing is unlikely to improve. She begins learning sign language with Yashvi and Shane's help. Shane saves Kirsha from being struck by Jimmy's bike, but he is injured and cannot accompany her to a Deaf Children Australia event, which knocks her confidence. Tia and her friends bully Kirsha about her signing, and later a period stain on her dress. Xanthe Canning (Lilly Van der Meer) stands up to them and helps Kirsha clean up. Tia continues to bully Kirsha by putting chewing gum in her hair and throwing sweets at her. Kirsha's hearing returns and she overhears Mishti telling Leo that she is pregnant, and she tells the family. Jimmy admits to Kirsha that he has a crush on Poppy Ryan (Eloise Ross), so she helps him talk to her and they begin dating. Poppy later tells Kirsha to stop being a third wheel when Jimmy invites her to join them. Poppy continues to be mean to Kirsha when they attend school camp together, until Yashvi warns her to back off. After stopping to rest during a hike, Kirsha and her teacher Susan Kennedy (Jackie Woodburne) become lost in the bush for a night. They are eventually found by Yashvi and led back to the camp. A few weeks later, Jimmy informs Kirsha that he is moving to New York with his father, causing Kirsha to panic about how she will survive school without him. The Rebecchis take part in a photoshoot for the Face of Lassiters campaign and posters are made for the complex. When the posters are vandalised, Kirsha admits to Shane that she did it, as she thought the family might be let go from the campaign and she would not be bullied again. When she learns that Marisa Taylor (Shannon Barker) has been accused and let go from her job at the hotel, Kirsha tells her the truth, leading Marisa to blackmail her. Kirsha eventually tells Shane about the blackmail and he promises to sort it out, but Marisa records him confronting her and the family are dropped as the Faces of Lassiters.

Kirsha is one of a handful of students who are poisoned by hydrogen cyanide gas planted in the school by Finn Kelly (Rob Mills). She is also held hostage by Raymond Renshaw (Frank Magree) in the café  and calls the police to alert them of his presence. Kirsha and her family move in with her uncle Toadfish Rebecchi (Ryan Moloney), after their house is sold. When Angela Lane (Amanda Harrison) calls for Elly to resign, Kirsha and Angela's daughter Lacy Lane (Sophie Hardy) create a petition to keep Elly at the school, which helps change Angela's mind. Kirsha helps Toadie with his accounts and confesses that she has been feeling overlooked recently. Toadie encourages her to speak up about what she wants and Kirsha tells her parents that she wants to apply for a scholarship at a school in Sydney. Both Dipi and Shane think it is too soon for her to leave home, citing her anxiety as an issue. Elly gives Toadie Kirsha's video essay, which he watches along with Shane and Dipi. While they refuse to change their minds, Toadie writes Kirsha a letter of recommendation and tells her to submit her application. Toadie and Shane fall out as a result, but soon reconcile. Kirsha learns that she has been accepted into the school, and Shane and Dipi decide to let Kirsha go. Kirsha says goodbye to Clancy and Yashvi, before telling her parents that she wants to go to Sydney alone to prove that she is independent. She arranges for Elly to drive her to the airport and for Mishti to pick her up. She says goodbye to Dipi and Shane in the street, promising to video call them all the time. Kirsha briefly returns to spend New Year with her family. Months later, Kirsha returns for Yashvi's graduation ceremony from the police academy, before she goes to science camp.

Yashvi Rebecchi

Yashvi Rebecchi, played by Olivia Junkeer, made her first appearance on 24 April 2017. The character and casting details were announced on 27 March 2017. Yashvi is Shane (Nicholas Coghlan) and Dipi Rebecchi's (Sharon Johal) older daughter. She was described as being "a boisterous troublemaker who's fearless and confident." Yashvi likes to try tricks and jokes out on new people, and enjoys being the centre of attention. She is more of an "opportunist" than a "bad girl". On 5 July 2021, Junkeer confirmed her departure from Neighbours after four and a half years. She cited her on-screen family's departure and a desire "to experience something different" as her reasons for leaving. Her exit scenes aired the following week.

Jeremy Newell

Jeremy "Jezza" Newell, played by Robbie Ryde, made his first appearance on 22 June 2017. The character and Ryde's casting details were announced on 8 June. Ryde previously appeared in the show as an extra. Jeremy is a carpenter, who appears in party scenes with fellow carpenter Amy Williams (Zoe Cramond). Of Jeremy, Ryde commented "My character is an antagonist, he's not a nice guy. It's always a challenge to play someone with different beliefs than yourself, but that is acting."

Jeremy attends Amy Williams' house warming at the Lassiter's Penthouse. He sees David Tanaka (Takaya Honda) and Tom Quill (Kane Felsinger) kissing. David later tries to make small talk with Jeremy, who replies with homophobic comments. He tells Amy that she should not be raising her young son Jimmy Williams (Darcy Tadich) around David. Amy become offended by his words and she tells him to leave the party, threatening to throw him off the balcony. He then leaves the party.

Mannix Foster

Mannix Foster, played by Sam Webb, made his first appearance on 26 June 2017. Webb's guest stint was announced in April 2017. Mannix is a friend of Leo Tanaka (Tim Kano), and Daniel Kilkelly of Digital Spy described Mannix as "a troublesome face from his past". Mannix has been wrongly accused of being a snitch and comes to Leo for help after he is stabbed. Leo asks his brother David Tanaka (Takaya Honda) to treat Mannix and reveals that he was actually responsible for telling the police about a nightclub's "dodgy practices". Mannix disappears from town after being threatened by Leo's father Paul Robinson (Stefan Dennis). Conor McMullan of Digital Spy thought the conclusion to the storyline "seemed a little too easy" and said "would someone like Mannix really be scared that easily when he holds all the cards?" Mannix made a cameo appearance on 18 December 2018 in a flashback sequence, and made another appearance from 17 January 2019. Webb reprised the role in March 2020, as Mannix is revealed to have scammed Paul's friend Jane Harris (Annie Jones).

Leo Tanaka organises a room for his friend Mannix at Robinsons motel. The motel's co-owner Stephanie Scully (Carla Bonner) becomes suspicious of him, after seeing people enter and leave his room. She also finds a bag of money in his room and Paul Robinson tells Leo that Mannix needs to leave by the end of the week. Steph later questions Mannix about his check out time. Mannix meets Elly Conway (Jodi Anasta) in Lassiter's Complex and she recognises him from the Sydney clubbing scene. She agrees to go for a drink with him to catch up. Mannix locks himself in his motel room and asks to see Leo. He reveals that he has been stabbed and Leo gets his brother David to treat him. Paul tells Leo that Mannix needs to leave, so Leo takes him to the backpackers' hostel, making his wound worse. Leo explains to David that he informed on the Renshaws, who were laundering money through a nightclub, but Mannix got the blame and that is likely the reason why he got stabbed. Mannix's condition worsens and David steals some morphine from the hospital to treat him.

Paul later shows up and tells Mannix that he will see to it that he never has a reason to return to Erinsborough. Paul later explains that he got a couple of men to threaten Mannix, before he was taken to a regional hospital and admitted under a false name. The following year, Paul tells Leo that he actually left Mannix in the middle of nowhere. When he sent an associate to check on him, Mannix was gone, so Paul assumed that he made his way to the nearest town. Delaney Renshaw (Ella Newton) later tells Paul that Mannix died as a result of his actions. However, Leo discovers this is a lie when he goes to meet up with Delaney's mystery contact and comes face-to-face with Mannix. He brings Mannix to Paul and Mannix explains that he called Delaney after Paul left him and he recovered in a nearby motel, before going to Indonesia. Mannix then admits to telling Delaney's father that it was Leo who went to the police about the money laundering. Mannix attempts to blackmail David by threatening to reveal that he stole medication from the hospital to help him, but David goes to the hospital board himself. After Paul tells him David went to the police, Mannix leaves town.

To get back at Paul, Mannix catfishes his friend Jane Harris and cons her out of her savings. Paul learns Mannix is behind the con and tells him to pay back the money, but Mannix tells him that he has already spent it on a car. When Paul says he will go to the police, Mannix threatens to publicly reveal the messages he and Jane exchanged and Paul realises he was planning on extorting more money from Jane. He tells Mannix to sell the car and start working for him, as he will make up the difference to pay Jane back. Jane later arranges to meet Mannix to understand why he conned her. She admits that she really connected with him and he hurt her more than anyone else. Mannix tries to tempt Jane into giving him a second chance, but she rejects him and says Paul will put him through hell. Weeks later, Mannix moves in with Mackenzie Hargreaves (Georgie Stone), who needs a flatmate to share the rent and utility bills. They get on well, but Mannix asks Mackenzie not to go in his room and he later puts a lock on the door. Mannix is wary of visitors to the house and tells Mackenzie that she should let him know if anyone is coming over. The police raid the apartment with Mackenzie and Harlow Robinson (Jemma Donovan) inside, but Mannix escapes, and turns up at Paul's house. He offers Paul some stolen electronics in lieu of the money he owes, but Paul refuses and tells him to forget the debt. As Mannix is leaving, Harlow spots him and he is tackled to the ground by her boyfriend Hendrix Greyson (Benny Turland). Mannix is arrested and he tells the police that he was scoping out houses to steal from.

Evan Lewis

Evan Lewis, played by Joe Klocek, made his first appearance on 7 July 2017. The character and Klocek's casting details were announced on 26 June. Evan is introduced as a rival for Ben Kirk (Felix Mallard). Tyler Brennan (Travis Burns) hires Evan as an apprentice mechanic at the local garage, and Ben soon learns he has more experience than him. Evan is also a potential love interest for Yashvi Rebecchi (Olivia Junkeer), who learns that they both have a passion for BMX bikes.

Evan begins working at Fitzgerald Motors alongside Tyler Brennan, and fellow apprentice Ben Kirk. Tyler tells Ben that Evan is in the third year of his apprenticeship, and sends Ben to get the coffees while he and Evan work inside. Evan comes to check on Ben and meets Yashvi Rebecchi. He admires her BMX bike, and asks if she is a member of a local Facebook BMX group. Yashvi later brings her bike to the garage for Evan to check over. When Yashvi's father brings his car to the garage, Yashvi takes the opportunity to spend time with Evan. They have a disagreement and Yashvi says he is stupid. She comes to apologise and invites Evan to a football game. Yashvi is forced to cancel the date when her younger sister goes missing, but Evan helps her search. He and Yashvi later attend a screening of another football match at Erinsborough Backpackers' and Yashvi gets drunk. Her mother confronts Evan, and he tells Yashvi that they are never going out again.

Days later, Yashvi comes by the garage and asks if she and Evan are okay. Ben points out that Yashvi still likes him and Evan later asks her out on another date. While they are together in Evan's car, Yashvi sends him out as she thinks she heard something. When he gets back in, he realises Yashvi has been through his phone and knows that he is Piper Willis' (Mavournee Hazel) internet troll. She throws his phone away and locks him out of the car when he goes to retrieve it. Yashvi accidentally reverses the car and hits something, which she assumes is Evan and she drives off. Evan calls Yashvi and she apologises for hitting him with the car and asks if the ambulance she called found him. He lies that his leg was injured and he cannot walk. He blackmails Yashvi into keeping quiet about him being Piper's troll. The following day, Evan comes to collect his car from the garage and quits his job. Yashvi's aunt Mishti Sharma (Scarlet Vas) confronts Evan for lying about being injured and harassing Piper. Evan is arrested and Piper tells him off for being a coward at the police station. Evan later receives a 12-month good behaviour bond.

Fay Brennan

Fay Brennan, played by Zoe Bertram, made her first appearance on 28 July 2017. Bertram's casting was announced on 17 July. She previously appeared in the show as Lorraine Dowski in 2011. Fay is the mother of Mark Brennan (Scott McGregor), Aaron Brennan (Matt Wilson) and Tyler Brennan (Travis Burns). Her introduction was revealed by Burns in May 2017. He commented that she would have a secret, while her arrival brings up issues from Tyler's past, resulting in "a big confrontation scene." Fay's introduction came about after the death of actor Russell Kiefel, who played the brothers' father Russell Brennan. Kiefel was due to reprise his role, but his unexpected death led to a storyline change. Wilson explained that all three brothers have various issues with their mother and Aaron acts "very out of character" towards her. Fay returns on 7 August 2020, as her Huntington's disease worsens and her daughter Chloe Brennan (April Rose Pengilly) wants her around. Pengilly said Chloe also wants to give her brothers a break. Bertram reprised the role for a final guest stint in February 2021. Fay's condition rapidly deteriorates while she is in Erinsborough and the character's death aired on 8 March 2021.

Fay comes to Erinsborough to see her sons Mark, Aaron and Tyler. Mark is pleased to see her, but Aaron questions her sudden visit. Fay later talks with Tyler about her divorce from their father, Russell. She apologises for leaving him and his brothers with Russell and for the abuse Tyler suffered at his hands. She also admits that she should have come to see him after he told her about it two years ago. Tyler accepts her apology and they reconcile, but Aaron is still angry with Fay for leaving them. Russell attempts to call Fay, but she rejects his call. His former partner Sheila Canning (Colette Mann) later introduces herself to Fay and asks if she has heard from Russell lately. Aaron and Fay talk and he tells her that he wishes she could have been around while he was coming to terms with his sexuality. Fay explains that Russell has been calling her lately, while Mark tells her Russell sent Sheila an apology letter. Fay calls Russell back and he asks her to visit him in Port Lincoln. Aaron encourages her to go.

Fay returns a couple of weeks later to inform the boys that Russell has had a heart attack and is in the hospital. As they plan to visit him, the hospital calls Fay and she informs her sons that Russell has died. Aaron's partner David Tanaka (Takaya Honda) contacts the hospital for more information and reveals that Russell's last words were Memory Cove, a place the family used to visit. Fay tells her sons that she is going back to Port Lincoln, before explaining to Sheila that she had an affair in Memory Cove and fell pregnant. Sheila realises that one of Russell's sons was not his and Fay begs her to keep it a secret. She then leaves town without saying goodbye. Fay returns when Sheila tells Mark, Aaron and Tyler the truth. Fay reveals that she had the affair while she and Russell were going through a rough patch in their marriage, so she knew the baby was not Russell's. She then tells Tyler he is not Russell's son and that his father's name is Hamish Roche (Sean Taylor). Fay apologises to Tyler, but he asks her to leave. At The Waterhole, Fay tells Sheila that without her, she might not have had the courage to tell Tyler the truth. Mark and Aaron tell her that it might take some time before Tyler can forgive her, and Fay returns to Adelaide. Fay later returns, at Mark's request. She sees Louise McLeod (Maria Theodorakis) at Erinsborough Hospital and recognises her as a nurse who cared for Russell in Port Lincoln. This leads Mark to deduce that Louise was in a relationship with Hamish and helped him murder Russell. Hamish is later killed, and while Tyler is awaiting trial for his murder, Fay claims she was the culprit, but her sons do not believe her confession. It is later revealed that she is innocent, as she spent the night of the murder with Bill Warley (Darren Mort).

Fay comes to Lassiters Hotel to visit her daughter Chloe Brennan (April Rose Pengilly), who has recently moved to Erinsborough. Fay walks in on Chloe kissing her boss Leo Tanaka (Tim Kano). Fay reveals that she has to sell her house, as she has been funding Chloe's lifestyle. Chloe vows to pay her mother back, while Fay says she will keep Chloe's relationship with Leo to herself. Fay and Sheila agree to look out for jobs for one another, but they fall out when Fay is offered Sheila's old job of managing The Waterhole. Chloe tells Fay that Sheila's son Gary Canning (Damien Richardson) is romantically interested in her, so she asks him out and he accepts. Following their date, Fay hears Gary telling Sheila that he is not interested in her. Sheila explains that she forced Gary into going on the date. When Fay hears that Tyler is struggling to cope in prison, she quits her job and returns to Adelaide. Fay returns to walk Aaron down the aisle during his wedding to David. Fays visits her children after Mark announces his engagement to Elly Conway (Jodi Anasta). She asks Chloe how she was able to pay her back in such large amounts, and Chloe explains that she went on dates with men in return for payment. She later tells Fay that she has Huntington's disease and that she suspects that Fay has it too. Fay admits that she has been having symptoms for a while and agrees to get tested. Fay's test comes back positive, and she decides to go to Bali to be with Tyler.

Fay returns to Erinsborough for Mark and Elly's wedding, where Elly reveals that she cheated on Mark with Chloe. When Chloe continues to talk about Elly, Fay slaps her as she is angry with Chloe's selfishness towards Mark. Fay tries to help Mark and Elly reconcile and she apologises to Chloe for slapping her. Fay tries giving Piper an update about Tyler, but Piper struggles to hear how he has moved on with his life when she is treading water. Mark tells Fay that Elly is pregnant and she encourages him to forgive Elly, before she returns to Adelaide. A few months later, Tyler calls his siblings to tell them Fay has gone missing. She soon turns up in Erinsborough and explains that she heard from Chloe that Mark was going through a hard time. Mark, Aaron and Chloe realise that Fay's Huntington's Disease is worse, and David later tells them that Fay's condition has progressed significantly. He suggests that she will need 24-hour supervision. The family go to Adelaide to come up with a plan for Fay, and Mark decides to move there to help Tyler and Piper take care of her. Months later, Mark calls Chloe to let her know that Fay almost choked on some food and needs to have a PEG tube fitted. Chloe goes to Adelaide to see her and, after talking it over with her husband Pierce Greyson (Tim Robards), invites Fay to stay with them for a while to give Mark and Tyler a break. Chloe and Pierce make the house more accessible, as Fay is now confined to a wheelchair, and they hire Nicolette Stone (Charlotte Chimes) to be her live-in nurse. Fay becomes fond of Nicolette, unaware of her ongoing feud with Pierce and her romantic feelings for Chloe. She is delighted when Chloe announces that she is pregnant. Pierce arranges for Fay to go on holiday with Aaron and David, and when she returns, she learns that Nicolette has got a new job. Fay arranges a baby shower for Chloe but she breaks down and reveals she has miscarried the baby. Fay decides to return to Adelaide; before she goes, she discovers that Nicolette has been causing a rift in Chloe and Pierce's marriage and urges her to stay away.

In the months that follow, Chloe separates from Pierce after Nicolette exposes his infidelity with Dipi Rebecchi (Sharon Johal). Chloe ends her friendship with Nicolette over her role in exposing Pierce's affair, but things are complicated when Nicolette becomes a surrogate for Aaron and David. When Fay visits Erinsborough, she mistakes the tension between Chloe and Nicolette for attraction, and continues to bond with Nicolette over her future grandchild. Aware of Nicolette's manipulative past, Toadie Rebecchi (Ryan Moloney) is suspicious when Fay changes her will to include Nicolette and raises it with the Brennans. Nicolette then confesses her past misdeeds, but Fay forgives her and insists she is part of their family. With her health deteriorating quickly, Fay pursues completing a bucket list, which includes trying Gary's famous chocolates one more time. She accidentally consumes a piece of chocolate which leads to an infection in her lungs. This becomes pneumonia and she is told she has days to live. She initially hides her diagnosis but confesses as her health worsens. She dies peacefully surrounded by Chloe, Aaron, David and Nicolette. Her body is flown to Adelaide for her funeral.

Hamish Roche

Hamish Roche, played by Sean Taylor, made his first appearance on 4 September 2017. The character's introduction was announced on 16 August 2017, while Taylor's casting details were announced on 28 August 2017. Hamish is Tyler Brennan's (Travis Burns) biological father, who arrives shortly after Tyler's mother Fay Brennan (Zoe Bertram) reveals that she had an affair, while married to Russell Brennan (Russell Kiefel). Bridget McManus of The Sydney Morning Herald described Taylor as being "marvellously suave" in his role of Hamish Roche. She also called the character a "smooth operator", and thought he worked "a little too hard" in his attempt to bond with Tyler and his brothers. McManus found the mystery of why he has a playing card in his wallet to be a "complicated familial conundrum on which soaps thrive". Hamish was killed off on 7 November 2017, but he made a brief reappearance on 22 August 2018, in which his murder is depicted in a flashback.

While he is in The Waterhole, Hamish notices Tyler Brennan playing pool and joins him for a game. He later turns up at Number 24 and introduces himself, and Tyler realises that Hamish is his father. He tells him to leave. Tyler's brother Mark Brennan (Scott McGregor) confronts Hamish, who states that he wants to get to know his son. Tyler later visits Hamish at Lassiter's with his girlfriend Piper Willis (Mavournee Hazel) and they talk. Hamish accepts Tyler's invitation to dine at The Waterhole with him and his brothers, Mark and Aaron Brennan (Matt Wilson). Hamish reveals that he never met their father Russell, but it emerges that he has the missing ace of spades playing card sent to him by Russell. Hamish gets to know Sheila Canning (Colette Mann). Hamish visits the boat Russell left to Tyler and Aaron, and encourages him to leave a message for Russell on his voicemail, like Aaron is doing. Hamish later pulls out Russell's phone and listens to Tyler's message. Hamish asks if he can stay on the boat, as he does not like the noise from the renovations at the hotel. Hamish continues to charm Sheila, before he meets up with his partner Louise McLeod (Maria Theodorakis) to tell her that he is working hard to secure the boat, so they can leave the country and avoid paying a large tax bill. He also plans to bring Tyler with them. When Tyler tells Hamish of his plans to sell the boat, Hamish convinces him to keep it and fix the engine himself.

Hamish learns about Tyler's history at the garage and that he is on his last chance with the boss. Hamish takes Tyler's keys to the garage and sabotages the mobile hoist, which later falls on Amy Williams, resulting in Tyler's dismissal from the garage. Hamish tells Amy that he will donate $200,000 to her Wellness Centre. When Sheila drops by the boat, she finds Russell's phone, but Hamish tells her it is his and then kisses her. Louise turns up unexpectedly and thinks they are ready to go, but Hamish wants to wait until Tyler has his boat licence. He convinces Louise to return to Port Lincoln. Hamish learns about Russell's abuse of Tyler. He starts putting doubts in Tyler's head about Mark's temper and tries goading Mark into violence. He manipulates Tyler into abandoning his brothers, and employs T-Bone to create fake texts that imply Piper has been cheating on Tyler with him. Hamish invites an increasingly isolated Tyler to join him on a trip overseas using the boat. When Louise becomes convinced that Hamish will betray her, she threatens to expose the fact that they worked together to get Russell to change his will, stole the original version, and murdered him. To stop her, Hamish poisons her with peanut oil, causing an anaphylactic reaction that leaves her comatose. However Mark and Sheila uncover clues to Hamish's true agenda, and Louise eventually awakens and steals the boat, also leaving information for Tyler, revealing Hamish's bankruptcy and the extent of his crimes. On the night of the Guy Fawkes Gala, Tyler confronts Hamish and they get into an argument, during which Tyler accuses Hamish of killing Russell, which he does not deny. The next morning Hamish is found dead in the hot tub of the Canning's family home by Stephanie Scully (Carla Bonner). The police conclude that he was murdered. Tyler later confesses to hitting Hamish with a garden gnome, and he is sent to prison. Months later, Hamish's other son Cassius Grady (Joe Davidson) reveals that after Tyler left, he drowned Hamish.

Cassius Grady

Cassius Grady, played by Joe Davidson, made his first appearance on 6 November 2017. Davidson was uncredited for this appearance, in which he appeared in the background of a party scene. The character and Davidson's casting details were later announced on 18 May 2018. Of joining the cast, Davidson said "I'm really enjoying it and there is a great sense of family here and everyone is so down to earth and friendly." Cassius is a gardener. Helen Daly of Daily Express said he would get "pulses racing – and it's not just because of his gardening skills." She also reported that he would become "sought-after" and that viewers would soon realise that there is more to Cassius than meets the eye. Cassius made his first credited appearance on 23 May 2018. Flashback scenes broadcast on 22 August 2018 revealed Cassius as the murderer of his father, Hamish Roche (Sean Taylor). Davidson filmed these scenes before beginning his regular role, along with his initial background appearance. At the conclusion of his storyline, the character was written out and Davidson made his final appearance as Cassius on 6 November 2018.

Cassius delivers leaflets detailing his gardening skills around Ramsay Street, and Gary Canning (Damien Richardson) brings him round to the yard at Number 26 to meet his mother Sheila (Colette Mann), who tells Gary that she does not want a gardener. However, Sheila later meets Cassius in the Lassiters Complex and hires him to tend to her garden, as she will be too busy with her new job. When Dipi Rebecchi (Sharon Johal) attempts to employ Cassius, Sheila arranges an exclusive contract with him. While picking up potting mix from Sonya's Nursery, Cassius knocks a box of apples that Piper Willis (Mavournee Hazel) was planning to juice, into a wheelbarrow full of manure. He gives Piper a brief apology and leaves. But he later replaces the apples with an apology note. Elly Conway (Jodi Anasta) brings Cassius to Number 28 and tells Susan (Jackie Woodburne) and Karl Kennedy (Alan Fletcher) that he is looking for work. Karl is unsure whether Cassius' work will be up to his standards, so Cassius offers to do some hours for free. Piper later gives him some tips to win Karl over, but Karl sees through Cassius' attempts to get on his good side and urges him to keep it up. Karl and Shane Rebecchi (Nicholas Coghlan) later fire Cassius after learning their wives have been watching him work. Cassius and Piper grow closer, and they share a kiss. He struggles with Piper's lingering feelings for her incarcerated former boyfriend, Tyler Brennan (Travis Burns), and she flees their awkward first date, as she feels that she is not ready to move on.

Xanthe Canning (Lilly Van De Meer) discovers that Cassius is the mystery book underliner Piper has been searching for. When Piper finds out, she meets with Cassius, who explains that the underlining is just something he does. He also mentions that he passed through Erinsborough a few months previously, where he dropped off some books at the book exchange. Piper apologises for leaving their date and they start their relationship over. Cassius takes a phone call and tells the caller that while he knows it is dangerous being in Erinsborough, he has fallen in love with Piper. Cassius helps Xanthe with some exercises to relieve pain in her hand, after she is injured in a hit-and-run. He tells Piper that he helped his mother with her rehab when she had an accident. The Cannings later employ Cassius to help Xanthe with her physiotherapy, but he rejects their offer of a room at Number 26, telling Piper that it would be awkward because of Xanthe's crush on him. When Piper accepts a new job, Sonya Rebecchi (Eve Morey) hires Cassius in her place at the nursery. Piper and Cassius plan to consummate their relationship, but Piper runs out of the Backpackers as it reminds her of Tyler. While comforting Piper, Cassius has a flashback to the time he rescued her from the shoreline and took her to the hospital. He later has a flashback to the time he rescued Gabriel Smith (Kian Bafekrpour) and brought him home to his parents. Cassius learns that his mother Elissa Gallow (Verity Charlton) has arrived in Erinsborough and is staying at Lassiters. When he visits her, Elissa urges Cassius to leave with her before anyone discovers that he is the one who really murdered his father, Hamish Roche (Sean Taylor). It emerges that Cassius came to Erinsborough to confront Hamish and ended up drowning him in the Canning's spa, before letting his half-brother, Tyler, take the blame. Cassius later returned to Erinsborough and posed as a gardener, so he could find his medallion that he dropped on the night of Hamish's death. Cassius refuses to leave with Elissa, as he is in love with Piper.

Bea Nilsson (Bonnie Anderson) catches Cassius taking Tyler's case file from Rebecchi Law, and he claims that he was interested and wanted to see if he could help. He later snaps at Bea when she tries to pick up his fallen bag. Cassius burns the jacket he gave Piper the night he found her on the shore. When Bea finds a keyring in Cassius' truck and he loses his temper with her Piper suggests that he speaks with a therapist and Cassius agrees. Piper and Cassius consummate their relationship. He then learns that Piper's brother Ned Willis (Ben Hall) has contacted Elissa, who tells him that she has booked a flight to Senegal, from which he cannot be extradited. Cassius tries to persuade Piper to join him, but she refuses to abandon her family and job. After learning that he saved her, Piper goes after Cassius seeking an explanation. Piper confronts Cassius as he tries to leave town, and he admits that he murdered Hamish, after which she calls the police and stalls him until they arrive. Cassius is brought to the police station for questioning. After learning that his mother has been arrested, Cassius refuses to talk until he knows she will be okay. Piper urges him to confess and he does. Cassius is transferred to Warrinor Prison. He asks Sheila to visit, and he apologises to her for the way Hamish's death affected her family. She accepts his apology, as she knows how badly Hamish treated him and the Brennans. Cassius asks if she can get Piper to visit him, but Mark and Aaron tell him to stop contacting Piper. Days later, Bea and Ned visit, so Bea can explain to Cassius how his behaviour affected her. Tyler also comes to see Cassius and accuses him of stealing months of his life. Later that day, Cassius is attacked by a fellow prisoner and has to undergo surgery at the hospital. Ned apologises to Cassius after revealing that a gang friend of his arranged the attack, after Ned spoke to him about Cassius. Piper has a pregnancy scare, but after learning that she is not pregnant, she says goodbye to Cassius.

Rory Zemiro

Rory Zemiro, played by Ash Williams, made his first appearance on 7 November 2017. The character and casting details were announced on 1 November. Williams auditioned for the extended guest role, and commented "I was like this sounds fun and cool and I had to put some work into it as it's not my forte." The comedian said he "relished" the chance to make the switch from comedy to drama. He called his character's storyline fun and a "beautiful, wonderful story." Rory is an exotic dancer and Aaron Brennan's (Matt Wilson) former boyfriend. Williams admitted that Rory has an agenda, saying "I'm pretty naughty, trying to run a business and also trying to find love, and it's good playing a character like that." Wilson later explained that Rory and Aaron met when they joined a dance troupe and had a relationship "many moons ago". When Rory sees Aaron again, he believes that things are going to go back to how they were between them.

Rory comes to see his former boyfriend Aaron Brennan at his hotel room in Paris. Rory explains that he saw Aaron was in the city from his Instagram posts and sweet talked the receptionist into giving him Aaron's room number. Rory tells Aaron that his former exotic dance troupe Rough Trade are on tour in Europe and that the boys would love to see him. Rory then helps Aaron to change his flight. Weeks later, Rory comes to Erinsborough to see Aaron. He witnesses Aaron's boyfriend David Tanaka (Takaya Honda) proposing to him. While working out at Aaron's gym, The Shed, Rory injures his back and has to go to the hospital, where he is treated by David. Rory visits The Flame Tree Retreat for a massage and Amy Williams (Zoe Cramond) offers him a job teaching yoga. Aaron later thanks Rory for not saying anything to David about their relationship, or their meeting in Paris. Rory asks Aaron to fill in for him at an audition. Rory teaches Aaron a dance routine and tries to get him to rejoin the dance troupe.

David comes to see the audition and learns that Aaron and Rory dated and that they met up in Paris. Rory later apologises to David, who tells him that he ended his relationship with Aaron. Rory notices Aaron's attempts to reunite with David. He later buys Aaron a drink and kisses him, but Aaron pulls away. Rory and Aaron notice Rough Trade fan Mick Allsop (Joel Creasey) is in town. Aaron had been led to believe that Mick was obsessed with him and often broke into the hotel rooms to get closer to him. Rory later tells Aaron that Mick has trashed his motel room, and he meets up with Mick at the Erinsborough Backpackers to talk. After Rory shows Aaron that David is now on a dating site, he kisses Aaron again and they spend the night together. Aaron confronts Rory after learning that Mick is actually obsessed with Rory, and had been having a casual relationship with him while he and Aaron were dating. Aaron also deduces that Rory broke up with him and sacked him from Rough Trade, as he preferred having casual relationships. Rory tells Aaron that Mick is lying, but Aaron texts Mick from Rory's phone and Mick's reply confirms Aaron's suspicions. Aaron then asks Rory to get out of his life.

Joanne Schwartz

Joanne Schwartz, played by Val Lehman, made her first appearance on 1 December 2017. The character and Lehman's casting details were announced on 5 September 2017. The actress filmed her scenes during the same week at the Nunawading studios, where she also filmed the Prisoner series in the 80's. She was reunited with her Prisoner co-star Colette Mann for the guest stint. Of joining the Neighbours cast, Lehman said "I was very surprised and delighted to receive the call about the role, something I thought would never happen." Joanne is an old friend of Sheila Canning (Mann), who comes back into her life. Daniel Kilkelly of Digital Spy called her an "unexpected blast from Sheila's colourful past". Lehman added that Joanne and Sheila would be "very much at odds" with one another.

Joanne is Sheila Canning's former best friend. They fell out during high school when they mistakenly thought each other was buying tickets to see Daddy Cool. Joanne then invited Sheila's crush, and future husband, Frank Canning to the school dance. Years later, Joanne agrees to meet Sheila in Erinsborough. They initially reminisce about some fun times they had in high school, before admitting that they are each waiting for an apology for the ticket fiasco and Frank. After bragging about their children, Sheila tells Joanne that she is performing a one-woman show at an upcoming variety night. Joanne then reminds Sheila of the last time she was on stage, where she forgot her lines and vomited over the lead actor. Joanne returns to Erinsborough to watch Sheila's performance. She laughs loudly when there is feedback from the microphone, causing Sheila to run off. Sheila comes back to perform her piece and when she mentions high school, Joanne hides in the bathroom. Sheila finds her and Joanne admits that she was jealous of Sheila in school, especially when Frank broke up with her for Sheila. Joanne also admits that she was meant to buy the Daddy Cool tickets, but was distracted by her Knitting Nancy. Sheila suggests that they go and see Daddy Cool's lead singer Ross Wilson in concert, but only if Joanne buys the tickets.

Others

References

External links
 Characters and cast at the Official Neighbours website
 Characters and cast at the Internet Movie Database
 Andrea Somers at the Official Neighbours website
 Dipi Rebecchi at the Official Neighbours website
 Kirsha Rebecchi at the Official Neighbours website
 Yashvi Rebecchi at the Official Neighbours website

2017
, Neighbours
2017 in Australian television